Miss World 2002, the 52nd edition of the Miss World pageant, was held on 7 December 2002 at the Alexandra Palace in London, United Kingdom. It was initially intended to be staged in Abuja, but due to religious riots in the nearby city of Kaduna (the "Miss World riots") the pageant was relocated to London.

A total of 110 contestants from all over the world were initially invited to compete for the crown, but several contestants boycotted the pageant and others dropping out in protest for the death sentence by stoning determined by an Islamic Sharia court to Amina Lawal, a Nigerian woman accused of adultery, making a total of 88 girls competing for the crown. It was the first time that audience participation through text messaging together with the scores of the judges helped in determining the results for the Top 20. Azra Akın from Turkey won the pageant, becoming the first ever representative from her country to be crowned Miss World. She was crowned by Agbani Darego of Nigeria. Show organizers stated that the event had a global viewership of over 2 billion people, and that it was broadcast in 137 countries. It was the first time in 51 years that it was not shown in the UK; no British channel agreed to broadcast the event.

Results

Placements

Continental Queens of Beauty

Contestants
88 contestants participated in Miss World 2002.

Notes

Returns
 Last competed in 2001:

Withdrawals during the contest
  – Paula Margarita Alonso Morales
  – Yu-Kyung Chang - She withdrew during the Miss World riots in Nigeria, with no intention to return. 
  – Blandina Mlenga
  – Karen Alexandre
  – Nilusha Gamage

Withdrawals, but later re-incorporated into the contest after moved to London
  – Lynsey Bennett
  – Yoselin Sánchez Espino
  – Lola Alcocer
  – Rava Maiarii

Boycotting due to Amina Lawal case 
  – Celine Roschek
  – Shirley Alvarez Sandoval 
  – Masja Juel
  – Eyrun Steinsson
  – Nadine Vinzens

Also boycotting but never invited:
  – Yannick Azebian
  – Sandrine Akuvi Agbokpe

Misc. Withdrawals and initial boycotts, but re-incorporated into the contest later on 
  - Danielle Luan went home after the contest moved to London with no intentions of rejoining but was later convinced to rejoin the competition under the condition that she was to not be officially judged in the pageant during finals night.
  - Katrine Sørland initially boycotted due to the Amina Lawal case but later rejoined after being promised by Julia Morley, the then President of Nigeria, Chief Olusegun Obasanjo, and the Nigerian Foreign Ministry that Lawal wouldn't be stoned to death.

Invited but never confirmed
  - No contest
  - Volha Nevdakh
  - No contest
  - Diane Ngo Mouaha
  - No contest
  - No contest
  - Ines Gohar
  - No contest
  - No contest. Lost its licence for Miss World.
  - No contest
  - Doja Lahlou 
  - No contest
  - Lost its licence for Miss World until 2003.
  - No contest
  - No contest. Lost its licence for Miss World.
  - No contest

Replacements
   – Cubie-Ayah George
  – Daniela Estefania Puig 
  – The winner of Miss Bulgaria 2002, Teodora Burgazlieva was replaced by her 2nd Runner up - Desislava Guleva because she did some nude pictures for Club M magazine before winning the Miss Bulgaria 2002 crown.
  – Miss Belgium 2002, Ann Van Elsen refused to participate in protest of the conviction of Amina Lawal.
  – The winner of Miss České republiky 2002, Kateřina Průšová didn't compete internationally due to her poor English skills. 
  – The winner of Miss Germany Wahl 2002, Katrin Wrobel had to relinquish the crown due to the fact that she wanted to focus on her modeling career. However her 1st runner up, Simone Wolf-Reinfurt got sick just days before her departure to Nigeria and was replaced by the 2nd runner up of Miss Germany Wahl 2002, Indira Selmic.
  – Miss France 2002, Sylvie Tellier refused to participate in protest of the conviction of Amina Lawal.
  – The winner of Ungfrú Ísland.is 2002, Sólveig Zophoníasdóttir was dethroned following her nude photos in Playboy magazine. But none of her runners-up accepted the crown for different reasons and disagreements over the winner's contract. Then the organizers picked Eyrun Steinsson as the Icelandic representative for Miss World 2002, but she later decided to boycott the contest.
  – The winner of Miss Mondo Italia 2002, Pamela Camassa resigned her crown because she wanted a normal life. Her 1st runner up, Susanne Zuber took her duties. 
  – Miss South Africa 2002 & 3rd runner up of Miss Universe 2002, Vanessa Carreira was unable to go to Miss World 2002 as the Miss South Africa 2003 contest was 1 day after the Miss World 2002 contest and she had to crown her successor. Also she refused to participate in protest of the conviction of Amina Lawal. Another South African pageant organization - Miss Junior South Africa, sent their 2002 winner - Karen Lourens. However MWO accepted the first runner up of Miss SA 2002, Claire Sabbagha to participate in Miss World 2002 despite being overage.
  – The winner of Miss Ukraine 2002, Olena Stohniy couldn't participate due to the fact that she was overage for Miss World rules, she was just 25 years old. She was replaced by one of her runners-up - Iryna Udovenko.

Historical significance

In the year leading up the finals in Nigeria, several European title holders lobbied their governments and the EU parliament to support Amina's cause. A number of contestants followed the lead of Kathrine Sørland of Norway in boycotting the contest (despite the controversy Sørland went on to become a semi-finalist in both the Miss World and Miss Universe contest), while others such as Costa Rica were instructed by their national governments and parliaments not to attend the contest. Among the other boycotting nations were Denmark, Spain, Switzerland, Panama, Belgium and Kenya. There was further controversy over the possibly suspended participation of France and South Africa, which may or may not have been due to the boycott. For her part, Lawal asked that contestants not suspend their participation in the contest, saying that it was for the good of her country and that they could, as the representative of Sweden had earlier remarked, make a much stronger case for her on the ground in Nigeria.

Despite the increasing international profile the boycott was garnering in the world press, the contest went ahead in Nigeria after being rescheduled to avoid taking place during Ramadan, with many prominent nations sending delegates. Osmel Sousa of Venezuela, one of the world's most influential national directors, famously said "there is no question about it (the participation of Miss Venezuela in the contest)." The trouble did not end there, however. A Thisday (Lagos, Nigeria) newspaper editorial suggesting that Muhammad would probably have chosen one of his wives from among the contestants had he been alive to see it, resulted in inter-religious riots that started on 22 November in which over 200 people were killed in the city of Kaduna, along with many houses of worship being burned by religious zealots. Because of these "Miss World riots", the 2002 pageant was moved to London, following widely circulated reports that the representatives of Canada and Korea had withdrawn from the contest and returned to their respective countries out of safety concerns. A fatwa urging the beheading of the woman who wrote the offending words, Isioma Daniel, was issued in Nigeria, but was declared null and void by the relevant Saudi Arabian authorities. Upon the pageant's return to England, many of the boycotting contestants chose to attend, including Miss Norway, Kathrine Sørland, who was tipped in the last few days as the number one favourite for the crown she had previously boycotted.

References

External links
 Pageantopolis – Miss World 2002

Miss World
2002 in London
2002 beauty pageants
Beauty pageants in the United Kingdom
December 2002 events in the United Kingdom